Duncan Cowan Ferguson (born 27 December 1971) is a Scottish former professional footballer, who is currently the manager of EFL League One club Forest Green Rovers. 

He began his career at Dundee United in 1990, and moved to Rangers in 1993 for what was then a British transfer record fee. He spent the remainder of his career in England, moving to Everton in 1994 before a stint with Newcastle United between 1998 and 2000, after which he returned to Everton where he retired in 2006.

During his career, Ferguson won the FA Cup with Everton in 1995. He was capped for Scotland seven times, playing at UEFA Euro 1992, but made himself unavailable for selection for the national team from 1997 due to a dispute with the Scottish Football Association. He has scored more goals than any other Scottish player in England's Premier League since its creation in 1992.

Ferguson's aggressive style of play resulted in a career total of nine red cards, as well as a three-month prison sentence following an on-field assault of Raith Rovers' John McStay in 1994. Eight of those red cards were in the English Premier League, where he holds the joint record for dismissals alongside Patrick Vieira and Richard Dunne. He is known by the nicknames "Big Dunc" and "Duncan Disorderly".

Ferguson was promoted to the first team coaching staff at Everton in 2014. Following the dismissal of Everton manager Marco Silva in December 2019, he was named as the team's caretaker manager until Silva's replacement Carlo Ancelotti was appointed manager a few weeks later, at which point Ferguson was made assistant manager. He was also the caretaker manager in both 2019 and 2022.

Club career

Dundee United
Born in Stirling, Ferguson played for the juvenile side Carse Thistle. Dundee United signed him as a schoolboy and he went on to win the BP Youth Cup in 1990. Later that year Ferguson made his professional debut for them against Rangers at Ibrox Stadium on 10 November 1990. His first goal was an extra time winner against East Fife in the Scottish Cup on 29 January 1991.

The following season saw him become a first team regular, with 41 appearances and 16 goals he became the club's top scorer. His good form continued in 1992–93 with 33 appearances and 15 goals. The form he displayed at Dundee United also saw him win a call up to the Scottish national team.

Rangers

Ferguson moved to Rangers in 1993 for a transfer fee of £4 million, which set a new British record. During a match with Raith Rovers in April 1994, Ferguson headbutted the visitors' John McStay in the south-west corner of the Ibrox pitch. Referee Kenny Clark did not see the incident, but Ferguson was subsequently charged and found guilty of assault. As it was his third conviction for assault, in addition to two other convictions, he received a three-month prison sentence in October 1995. The SFA banned Ferguson for 12 matches before the court case was heard.

Ferguson scored a last-minute winner against Motherwell, from a Brian Laudrup pass, in the first game of the season. Four days later, he scored a hat-trick in a 6–1 win over Arbroath.

Of Ferguson's time at Rangers, one of his strike partners Mark Hateley said: "Duncan was a really good player, but I think he came to Rangers a couple of years too early. Walter Smith wanted me to take him under my wing. He was a boisterous young lad who wanted to play all the time. It was a period in his career where he'd gone from being a big fish in a small pond to being a small fish in the big pond at Rangers. He probably found that a bit difficult."

Everton
In October 1994, Everton were struggling under the management of Mike Walker and looking for options to reinvigorate their faltering season. The solution enacted was to take two Rangers players on a loan deal, Ian Durrant for one month and Ferguson for three. Ferguson's move to Everton was later made permanent by Walker's successor Joe Royle, and Ferguson played a key role in saving Everton from relegation, and also helping them win the 1994–95 FA Cup. The subsequent 1995–96 season was less successful for Ferguson. A persistent hernia problem caused him to be unavailable for large amounts of time, as did his prison sentence during the first half of the season.

On 28 December 1997, Ferguson scored a hat-trick against Bolton Wanderers in a 3–2 victory, the first time that a trio of headers had been scored in the Premier League. Everton finished the season surviving relegation only on goal difference.

Ferguson was sold to Newcastle United for a fee of £8 million in November 1998. The deal was done to sell Ferguson by the Everton chairman, Peter Johnson, without the knowledge of Walter Smith. Ferguson wrote a two-page goodbye letter in the club magazine to fans, stating his sadness at leaving and that he would never forget them.

Newcastle United
After bringing Ferguson to Newcastle, manager Ruud Gullit was rewarded when Ferguson scored twice on his debut against Wimbledon in the Premier League. The final result was a 3–1 victory to Newcastle. At the start of 1999, Ferguson suffered a hernia injury, meaning that he played only seven times in the 1998–99 season. He made his comeback on 11 April, coming on as a substitute in a 2–0 extra-time FA Cup semi-final win over Tottenham Hotspur, and did the same in  the 1999 FA Cup Final, which Newcastle lost to Manchester United.

In 1999–2000, Ferguson scored in three rounds of the FA Cup as Newcastle beat Tottenham 6–1, Sheffield United 4–1 and Tranmere Rovers 3–2, before a semi-final elimination by Chelsea. He scored six league goals, including two in a 5–0 home win over Southampton on 16 January 2000.

Return to Everton

On 17 August 2000, Ferguson moved back to Everton for a fee of £3.75 million. The transfer had previously been close to collapse as he sought a £1 million "loyalty payment" from Newcastle for not personally asking for a transfer; he had made the same amount of money from Everton when he transferred in 1998 on the same basis. Two days after signing, he played his first game in a 2–0 loss at Leeds United, coming on for Stephen Hughes after 56 minutes. On 23 August, on his return to Goodison Park, he scored twice in a 3–0 win over Charlton Athletic after coming on for Mark Hughes in the 67th minute.

On 1 April 2002, Ferguson was sent off after 20 minutes for elbowing Bolton Wanderers' Kostas Konstantinidis in an off-the-ball incident in a 3–1 win for a struggling Everton side.

In August 2003, Jamie Jackson of The Guardian called Ferguson "arguably the biggest waste of money of all", citing his high transfer fees and wages compared to his injury record and age. By that point, he had scored 12 times in 41 games in three years at Everton, while earning over £5 million in salary. His 192 minutes of play in 2002–03 as a goalless substitute cost the club £9,000 per minute.

Ferguson was accused of racial abuse by Fulham's Luís Boa Morte after an FA Cup fourth round match in January 2004. The accusation was dismissed by the Football Association, who found insufficient evidence. On 28 December that year, Ferguson came on for Marcus Bent in the 74th minute of Everton's 2–0 loss at Charlton, and within ten minutes he was sent off for an elbow on Hermann Hreiðarsson.

During the 2005–06 season, Ferguson was sent off against Wigan Athletic for violent conduct. His confrontation with Paul Scharner and subsequent fracas with Pascal Chimbonda resulted in a seven-match ban and saw his Premier League red–card count reach eight, equalling Patrick Vieira's record. On 7 May 2006, against West Bromwich Albion at Goodison Park, Ferguson was named captain in the game that marked the end of his Everton career. His 90th-minute penalty kick was saved by Tomasz Kuszczak, but he subsequently scored from the rebound, netting his final goal for the club. Ferguson was not given a new Everton deal and retired, moving his family to Mallorca and spurning advances from a number of clubs.

Ferguson played for Everton in a testimonial match in his honour on 2 August 2015 against Villarreal.

International career
Ferguson made his first full international appearance for Scotland on 17 May 1992, in a 1–0 win over the United States in Denver. He was selected for UEFA Euro 1992 in Sweden, making one substitute appearance against reigning champions the Netherlands on 12 June. He withdrew from UEFA Euro 1996 in England due to surgery on a recurring hernia. He made seven Scotland appearances in all, with his last appearance coming in February 1997.

Ferguson refused international selection after 1997, partly in protest against his treatment by the SFA after his conviction for assault on John McStay and in particular the imposition of a 12-game ban on top of his three-month prison sentence. Ferguson believed that second punishment violated the principle of double jeopardy. Speaking in February 2023, Ferguson said that not playing more for Scotland was the "biggest regret in my career". He also revealed that Scotland managers had repeatedly asked him to come out of retirement, with the last request coming from Walter Smith in 2005. Ferguson blamed his own "pig-headedness" for not accepting those invitations.

Coaching career

Everton

Having spent five years in Mallorca following his retirement from playing, Ferguson contacted his former manager at Everton, David Moyes. Ferguson asked if he could work with the Everton academy students at Finch Farm.

Initially Ferguson was a voluntary worker at the academy, working for Alan Irvine, a former mentor of his from his playing career. Although Ferguson remains disappointed with the Scottish FA for what he sees as a lack of support following his sentencing in 1995, he enrolled on a nine-day Scottish FA organised coaching course in Largs, Scotland to earn a UEFA B-Licence. In May 2012, he returned to Largs to achieve a UEFA A licence and in January 2013 he enrolled on a further course and is working towards a UEFA Pro Licence. In February 2014 Ferguson was promoted to the first team coaching staff at Everton. His first game in the role was a home game against West Ham United on 1 March 2014.

Following the dismissal of manager Marco Silva on 5 December 2019, Ferguson was named as caretaker manager of Everton. In his first game in charge two days later, Everton beat Chelsea 3–1 to lift themselves out of the relegation zone. Following the appointment of Carlo Ancelotti as the new manager later that month, Ferguson was made assistant manager, a role he retained under Rafael Benítez who joined the club following Ancelotti's departure to Real Madrid in June 2021.

On 18 January 2022, Ferguson was again appointed caretaker manager following the sacking of Rafael Benítez. He oversaw one game as caretaker, a 1–0 home loss to Aston Villa, before Frank Lampard was appointed as the new manager. Ferguson remained at the club for the rest of the season as a first-team coach, before announcing his departure from the club in July 2022.

Forest Green Rovers
On 26 January 2023, Ferguson was appointed head coach of League One side Forest Green Rovers, his first managerial role of his career.

Upon his appointment, Ferguson stated; “I’m really delighted to join FGR for the next step of my career, and I plan to be here for a while. We have a bit of a fight on our hands to stay up in League One and I am ready for the challenge.  Dale Vince, Chairman of the club, commented: “We’re all excited to welcome Duncan, he is someone I have admired from a far for a while. It’s just fantastic to have the opportunity to work with him in this next phase of our journey toward the Championship.”

Personal life

Burglary attempts at his homes
In 2001, two burglars broke into Ferguson's home in Rufford, Lancashire. Ferguson confronted them and was able to detain one of them, who subsequently spent three days in hospital. The second man managed to flee but was eventually caught. Both men were sentenced to 15 months' imprisonment for their actions.

In January 2003, Ferguson caught another burglar at his home in Formby, Merseyside; the burglar attacked Ferguson, who retaliated. The burglar was hospitalised and later alleged that Ferguson had assaulted him, but this was dismissed by police.

Convictions for physical altercations
Ferguson has had four convictions for assault – two arising from taxi rank scuffles, one an altercation with a fisherman in an Anstruther pub, and one for his on-field headbutt on Raith Rovers defender John McStay in 1994 while playing for Rangers, which resulted in a rare conviction for an on-the-field incident.

The first incident led to a £100 fine for headbutting a policeman and a £25 fine for a Breach of the Peace, while the second resulted in a £200 fine for punching and kicking a supporter on crutches. He was sentenced to a year's probation for the third offence. For the 1994 on-the-field headbutting, he received and served a three-month jail term for assault. Ferguson's troubles with the law and his imprisonment inspired Finnish composer Osmo Tapio Räihälä to write a symphonic poem as a "musical portrait" of Ferguson, titled Barlinnie Nine.

Campaigning
Ferguson has pledged his support to the "Keep Everton in Our City" campaign, saying:

Career statistics

Club

International

Managerial record

Honours
Dundee United
Scottish Cup runner-up: 1990–91

Rangers
Scottish Premier Division: 1993–94
Scottish Cup runner-up: 1993–94

Everton
FA Cup: 1994–95

Newcastle United
FA Cup: runner-up 1998–99

Individual
Premier League Player of the Month: February 1995

References

External links

1971 births
Living people
Scottish expatriates in Spain
Dundee United F.C. players
Everton F.C. players
Association football forwards
Newcastle United F.C. players
Scottish Football League players
Premier League players
Rangers F.C. players
Scotland international footballers
Scottish footballers
UEFA Euro 1992 players
Scottish people convicted of assault
Scotland under-21 international footballers
Everton F.C. non-playing staff
Scottish football managers
Everton F.C. managers
Forest Green Rovers F.C. managers
Premier League managers
Association football coaches
Sportspeople convicted of crimes
FA Cup Final players